Vilenica Cave or Vilenica Cave at Lokev is the oldest show cave in Europe. The first tourists to the cave were recorded in 1633. It is located next to the village of Lokev in the municipality of Sežana on the Karst Plateau in southwestern Slovenia.

Natural environment

History 
Until the mid-19th century it was known as the biggest, most beautiful, and most frequently visited cave of the Classical Karst. It attracted artists such as Ferdinand Runk and Peter Fendi, who was awarded a gold medal in 1821 for his oil painting of the cave. Later it was surpassed by Postojna Cave.

Since 1986, the annual Vilenica International Literary Festival has taken place in the cave and in the towns and villages of the Karst and elsewhere. The event most commonly happens in the beginning of September. The central part of the festival is the conferral of the Vilenica Prize for literature by the Slovene Writers' Association. The award is bestowed in the cave's Plesna Hall on an author from Central Europe for his or her achievements in literary and essay writing.

References

Show caves in Slovenia
Arts centres in Slovenia
Municipality of Sežana
Caves of the Slovene Littoral